United Nations Security Council resolution 619 was a resolution adopted unanimously on 9 August 1988 by the United Nations. The resolution came after recalling Resolution 598 (1987) and approving a report by the Secretary-General Javier Pérez de Cuéllar on the implementation of paragraph 2 of Resolution 598.

The Council therefore decided to establish the United Nations Iran–Iraq Military Observer Group for an initial period of six months to monitor the ceasefire between Iran and Iraq at the end of their conflict.

See also
 Iran–Iraq relations
 Iran–Iraq War
 List of United Nations Security Council Resolutions 601 to 700 (1987–1991)
 Resolutions 479, 514, 522, 540, 552, 582, 598, 612, 616 and 620

References
Text of the Resolution at undocs.org

External links
 

1988 in Iran
1988 in Iraq
 0619
Middle East peace efforts
 0619
August 1988 events